(born April 16, 1972) is a Paralympic alpine skier from Japan. She has competed at every Winter Paralympic Games since 1994, winning a total of two gold, three silver, and three bronze medals up to 2006. At the 2010 Winter Paralympics, she won two bronze medals in the women's sitting class of slalom and giant slalom.

References

External links 
 
Obinata ski site (Japanese)

1972 births
Living people
Japanese female alpine skiers
Paralympic alpine skiers of Japan
Alpine skiers at the 1994 Winter Paralympics
Alpine skiers at the 1998 Winter Paralympics
Alpine skiers at the 2002 Winter Paralympics
Alpine skiers at the 2006 Winter Paralympics
Alpine skiers at the 2010 Winter Paralympics
Paralympic gold medalists for Japan
Paralympic silver medalists for Japan
Paralympic bronze medalists for Japan
Medalists at the 2010 Winter Paralympics
Medalists at the 2006 Winter Paralympics
Medalists at the 2002 Winter Paralympics
Medalists at the 1998 Winter Paralympics
Paralympic medalists in alpine skiing
21st-century Japanese women